A&W, AW, Aw, aW or aw may refer to:

Companies 
 A&W Restaurants
 A&W Root Beer
 Addison-Wesley, publishers
 Africa World Airlines, IATA code
 Prefix for helicopters made by AgustaWestland
 Allied Waste Industries, Inc, stock symbol on NYSE
 Armstrong Whitworth, a British manufacturing company

Media and entertainment 
 Accel World, a Japanese light novel series
 Active Worlds, a 3D virtual reality platform
 Another World (TV series), an American soap opera
 Aviation Week, magazine
 Call of Duty: Advanced Warfare, an action video game

People
 A. H. Weiler (1908 – 2002), The New York Times film critic whose early reviews were signed with his initials A. W.
 A. W. (poet), anonymous 16th century poet
 Abraham Washington (A. W.), American professional wrestler and wrestling commentator
 Alan Walker (born 1997), English-Norwegian music producer and DJ
 Aw (father), honorific title in the Harari and Somali languages
 Aw (surname), a Cantonese surname
 John-Allison Weiss, an American singer-songwriter formerly known as A. W.

Places
 Ahrweiler (district), Germany, vehicle registration code
 Aruba (ISO 3166-1 2-letter country code AW)

Science and technology
 .aw, the internet top level domain country code for Aruba
 Airwatt, a unit of the effectiveness of vacuum cleaners
 Aw, categorization for tropical savanna climate in the Köppen classification system
 AW, in German email subject line, equivalent to Re:
 aw, or attowatt, an SI unit of power
 aw, or water activity, the relative availability of water in a substance

Other uses
 Agencja Wywiadu, the Polish foreign intelligence service
 Ahnapee and Western Railway, A&W
 Arctic Warfare, a sniper rifle
 Aviation Warfare Systems Operator, a rating in the United States Navy
 Aw, a digraph in Latin-script
 AW, US Navy hull classification symbol for "distilling ship"

See also
 Av